Eugene O'Doherty may refer to:
 Eugene O'Doherty (bishop)
 Eugene O'Doherty (footballer)